No. 130 Helicopter Unit (Condors) is a Helicopter Unit and is equipped with Mil Mi-17 and based at Leh Air Force Station.

History

Assignments
Kargil War

Aircraft
Mil Mi-17

References

130